Hildur Ingveldardóttir Guðnadóttir (born 4 September 1982) is an Icelandic musician and composer. A classically trained cellist, she has played and recorded with the bands Pan Sonic, Throbbing Gristle, Múm, and Stórsveit Nix Noltes, and has toured with Animal Collective and Sunn O))). She has received various accolades, including an Academy Award, two Grammy Awards, and a Primetime Emmy Award.

Hildur has gained international recognition for her film and television scores, including for Journey's End (2017), Mary Magdalene (2018), Sicario: Day of the Soldado (2018), Todd Field's Tár and Sarah Polley's Women Talking (both 2022).
For her score to Todd Phillips' psychological drama film Joker (2019), she won the Academy Award for Best Original Score, the BAFTA Award for Best Original Music, and the Golden Globe Award for Best Original Score, making her the first solo female composer to win in all three. She is also known for her work on the HBO miniseries Chernobyl (2019), which won her a Primetime Emmy Award, a BAFTA TV Award and a Grammy Award.

Personal life
Hildur was born in 1982 in Reykjavík, Iceland, and was raised in Hafnarfjörður.
She comes from a family of musicians — her father, Guðni Franzson, is a composer, clarinet player and teacher. Her mother, Ingveldur Guðrún Ólafsdóttir, is an opera singer, and her brother is Þórarinn Guðnason from the band Agent Fresco. Hildur began playing cello at the age of five and performed her first professional gig at 10 alongside her mother at a restaurant. She attended the Reykjavik Music Academy and went on to study composition and new media at the Iceland Academy of the Arts and the Berlin University of the Arts.

Hildur lives in Berlin with her son (born 2012).  She is married to Sam Slater, an English composer, music producer and sound artist, with whom she collaborated on multiple projects including Chernobyl  and Joker. She also used to share a studio with fellow composers Dustin O'Halloran and the late Jóhann Jóhannsson, the latter being a frequent collaborator, while residing in Berlin.

Career
In 2006, Hildur released a solo album, Mount A, under the name Lost In Hildurness, on which she attempted to "involve other people as little as [she] could." It was recorded in New York City and Hólar in the north of Iceland. 2009 saw the release of her second solo album, Without Sinking, on the U.K.-based audio-visual label, Touch.

As well as playing cello and halldorophone, Hildur also sings and arranges choral music, once arranging a choir for performances by Throbbing Gristle in Austria and London. As a composer she has written a score for the play Sumardagur ("Summer Day") performed at Iceland's National Theatre. She has also written the score for the Danish film Kapringen  (2012), Garth Davis' 2018 film Mary Magdalene (in collaboration with Jóhann Jóhannsson), Stefano Sollima's Sicario: Day of the Soldado (2018). Her work on the 2019 Chernobyl miniseries was met with critical acclaim, and won her a Primetime Emmy Award and the Grammy Award for Best Score Soundtrack for Visual Media.

She composed the score to the 2019 film Joker, starring Joaquin Phoenix and Robert De Niro, and directed by Todd Phillips, for which she won the Premio Soundtrack Stars Award at the 76th Venice International Film Festival and the Golden Globe Award for Best Original Score, becoming the first solo woman composer to win in this category. At the 92nd Academy Awards, Hildur won the award for Best Original Score, becoming the first woman to win since the Original Dramatic Score and Original Musical or Comedy Score categories were combined in 2000.
She is the first Icelander to win an Oscar.

In 2021, Hildur collaborated with her husband, Sam Slater, on the video-game score for Battlefield 2042 by DICE (company) and EA Games. The soundtrack was released 10 September 2021.

Discography

Solo
Mount A (as Lost in Hildurness) (12 Tónar 2006)
re-released by Touch Music in 2010, as Hildur Guðnadóttir
Without Sinking (Touch, 2009), with a vinyl version with extra tracks in 2011
Leyfðu Ljósinu (Touch, 2012), with a multi-channel version on USB
Saman (Touch, 2014), with a vinyl version

Collaboration
Rúnk – Ghengi Dahls (Flottur kúltúr og gott músik) 2001
Mr. Schmucks Farm – Good Sound (Oral 2005)
Stórsveit Nix Noltes – Orkídeur Hawai (12 Tónar/Bubblecore 2005)
Angel and Hildur Guðnadóttir – In Transmediale (Oral 2006)
Hildur Guðnadóttir with Jóhann Jóhannsson – Tu Non Mi Perderai Mai (Touch 2006)
Nico Muhly – Speaks volumes (Bedroom Community 2006)
Valgeir Sigurðsson – Equilibrium Is Restored (Bedroom Community 2007)
Ben Frost – Theory of Machines (Bedroom Community 2006)
Skúli Sverrisson – Sería (12 Tónar 2006)
Pan Sonic – Katodivaihe/Cathodephase (Blast First Petite 2007)
Múm – Go Go Smear the Poison Ivy (Fat Cat 2007)
Hildur Guðnadóttir, BJ Nilsen and Stilluppsteypa – Second Childhood (Quecksilber 2007)
Múm - Sing Along to Songs You Don't Know (Morr Music 2009)
The Knife – Tomorrow, In a Year (2010)
Wildbirds & Peacedrums – Rivers (The Leaf Label 2010)
 Sōtaisei Riron + Keiichirō Shibuya – Blue (Strings Edit) feat. Hildur Guðnadóttir (Commmons 2010)
Skúli Sverrisson – Sería II (Sería Music 2010)
Hauschka – Pan Tone (Sonic Pieces 2011)
Múm - Smilewound (Morr Music 2013)
Craig Sutherland – Strong Island (2017)
 Sunn O))) – Life Metal (2019)
 Sunn O))) – Pyroclasts (2019)
 Sam Slater - Battlefield 2042 (2021)

Film work

Television

Awards and nominations

Notes

References

External links

 
 

1982 births
Living people
21st-century composers
21st-century women composers
Berlin University of the Arts alumni
Best Original Music BAFTA Award winners
Best Original Music Score Academy Award winners
Deutsche Grammophon artists
Golden Globe Award-winning musicians
Grammy Award winners
Icelandic cellists
Icelandic electronic musicians
Icelandic film score composers
Icelandic women in electronic music
Musicians from Reykjavík
People from Hafnarfjörður
Primetime Emmy Award winners
Television composers
Video game composers
Women cellists
Women film score composers
Women television composers
21st-century cellists
Icelandic composers